The 2007 Copa Sudamericana Finals was a two-legged football match-up to determine the 2007 Copa Sudamericana champion. The final was contested by Argentine side Arsenal de Sarandí and Mexican Club América. The first leg was held in Estadio Azteca in Mexico City where Arsenal won 3–2. In the second leg, held in Estadio Juan Domingo Perón (home venue of Racing Club de Avellaneda), América won 2–1.

Despite both teams finished equaled on points (3–3 and 4–4 on aggregate), Arsenal won the competition on away goals rule, achieving their first international title.

Qualified teams

Venues

Match summary

First leg

Second leg

References

Finals
Copa Sudamericana Finals
Copa Sudamericana 2007
Copa Sudamericana 2007
Copa Sudamericana Finals
Copa Sudamericana Finals